Albania has more than 152 rivers and streams, forming 8 large rivers flowing from southeast to northwest, mainly discharging towards the Adriatic coast.

A majority of the precipitation that falls on Albania, drains into the rivers and reaches the coast on the west without even leaving the country. In the north, only one small stream escapes Albania. In the south, an even smaller rivulet drains into Greece. Due to the topographical divide is east of the border with the Republic of North Macedonia. An extensive portion of the basin of the White Drin, basin is in the Dukagjin region, across the northeastern border with Kosovo. The Lake of Ohrid, Lake of Prespa and the Small Lake of Prespa on the southeast, as well as the streams that flow into them, drain into the Black Drin. The watershed divide in the south also dips nearly  into Greece at one point. Several tributaries of the Vjosa River rise in that area. About 65% of their watershed lies within the Albanian territory. The water temperature ranges from 3.5 to 8.9 °C in the winter, and from 17.8 to 24.6 °C in the summer months.

Main rivers

Other rivers

Basins
Organized by drainage basin. Albanian-language names are listed if different from English. Italics indicate that the body of water is not in or bordering Albania.

Adriatic Sea
 Bojana – 
 Great Drin – 
 White Drin – 
 Black Drin – 
 Lake Ohrid – 
 Valbona
 Gashi
 Shala
 Kir
 Lake Skadar – 
 Morača – 
 Cem
 Mareza
 Gulf of Drin – 
 Small Drin; see Great Drin above
 Aoös – 
 Drino
 Shushicë
 Sarantaporos
 Seman
 Osum
 Devoll
 Tomorrica
 Shkumbin
 Mat
 Fan
 Erzen
 Ishëm
 Gjole
 Tërzukë
 Tiranë
 Lanë
 Zezë

Ionian Sea
 Pavllë
 Bistricë
 Blue Eye (spring) –

Black Sea
 Danube – 
 Sava
 Drina
 Lim

See also 

 Protected areas of Albania
 Geography of Albania
 Climate of Albania
 Biodiversity of Albania

References 

 

Albania
Rivers
Landforms of Albania